Side was a town on the eastern coast of ancient Laconia, a little north of the promontory Malea. It was said to have existed before the Dorian conquest, and to have derived its name from a daughter of Danaus. The inhabitants were removed by the Dorian conquerors to the neighbouring town of Boeae.

The location of Side is tentatively identified as near modern Velanidia.

References

Populated places in ancient Laconia
Former populated places in Greece